Mattia Finotto (born 28 December 1992) is an Italian professional footballer who plays as a forward for  club Cosenza.

Club career
Finotto made his professional debut in the Lega Pro for SPAL on 31 August 2014 in a game against Pontedera.

On 5 July 2019, he returned to Monza on a 2-year contract.

On 1 February 2021, Finotto was sent on a six-month loan to Serie B side Pordenone.

On 12 January 2022, Monza announce the sale of Finotto to SPAL on a permanent basis.

On 16 June 2023, Finotto signed a 1.5-year contract with Cosenza.

Career statistics

Honours 
Monza
 Serie C Group A: 2019–20

References

External links
 

1992 births
People from Pieve di Soligo
Sportspeople from the Province of Treviso
Footballers from Veneto
Living people
Italian footballers
Association football forwards
A.C. Monza players
A.C. Sambonifacese players
S.P.A.L. players
Ternana Calcio players
A.S. Cittadella players
Pordenone Calcio players
Cosenza Calcio players
Serie C players
Serie B players